That Should Not Be: Our Children Will Accuse Us (Original title: Nos enfants nous accuseront, US title: Food Beware: The French Organic Revolution) is a 2008 French documentary film directed by Jean-Paul Jaud.

The documentary is about food poisoning by toxins from agricultural chemicals such as pesticides, herbicides, fertilizers, etc.

Synopsis
The film tells the story of an initiative in Barjac, a commune located in the Gard department in southern France, that decided to introduce organic produce into the town's school cafeteria. The film depicts without concessions the environmental tragedy which threatens the young generation: the poisoning of our country sides by agricultural pesticides (76 000 tons of pesticides used each year in France) and the harm caused to public health and safety.

External links
 Official site
 

French documentary films
Documentary films about agriculture
Documentary films about environmental issues
2008 films
2008 documentary films
2000s French-language films
Sustainable agriculture
2000s English-language films
2000s French films